Sauve may refer to:

People
 Saint Sauve (died c. 614), Bishop of Amiens
 Charlotte de Sauve (1551–1617), French noblewoman
 Chris Sauve, Canadian animator
 Sebastian Sauve (born 1987), American model

Places
 La Sauve, France
 Sauve, Gard, France
 , a river in France, tributary of the Aigues

See also
 Sauvé (disambiguation)